David Parry may refer to:

Sports
David Parry (American football) (born 1992), American football nose tackle
David Parry (English cricketer) (born 1956), English cricketer
David Parry (footballer) (born 1948), footballer for Tranmere Rovers
David Parry (Nevisian cricketer), Nevisian cricketer

Musicians
David Parry (folk musician) (1942–1995), Canadian folk musician
David Parry (conductor) (born 1949), English conductor

Others
David Parry (biophysicist), New Zealand biophysicist
David Parry (dialectologist), British dialectologist
David Parry (scholar) (c. 1682–1714), Welsh scholar and keeper of the Ashmolean Museum in Oxford
David Hughes Parry (1893–1973), university administrator and professor of law
David M. Parry (1852–1915), American industrialist and writer
David Parry-Evans (born 1935), British RAF Air Marshal
David W. Parry (born 1958), British pastor, poet, essayist and dramaturge
Dave Parry (born 1964), sound and lighting designer

See also 
David Parry-Jones (1933–2017), Welsh sports broadcaster and author
David Perry (disambiguation)
Parry (surname)